SS Mahratta can refer to one of three vessels:

 , lost in a collision in 1887
 , wrecked in 1909
 , wrecked in 1939

Ship names